Repipta is a mostly neotropical genus of assassin bug, family (Reduviidae), in the subfamily Harpactorinae.

Partial list of species
Repipta flavicans
Repipta taurus

References

Reduviidae